The United States Air Force Academy Band is a United States military band based out of Peterson Space Force Base near Colorado Springs, Colorado. Despite the fact that it provides musical support to the USAFA Cadet Wing, it is an active duty full time band. The USAFA Drum and Bugle Corps on the other hand is staffed by cadets of the academy. The band, like many other USAF bands, performs in a distinctive ceremonial dress, which includes a choker-style collar, and silver-braided epaulettes. It is one of two premier ensembles in the air force, with the other being the United States Air Force Band. The band was raised in 1955, shortly after the foundation of the academy.

The band is composed of the following ensembles:

Marching Band
Concert Band (45 members)
The Falconaires
Blue Steel
Academy Winds
Rampart Winds
Stellar Brass
Wild Blue Country

The band performs at public/civic as well as community events. It often leads military parades at the academy or performs for Falcon fans at American football games.

See also 
List of United States Air Force bands
United States Air Force Band
West Point Band
United States Naval Academy Band
United States Naval Academy Pipes and Drums
United States Merchant Marine Academy Regimental Band

References

External links 

The marching band at the  2009 USAFA awards parade

Band
Bands of the United States Air Force
Military academy bands
Military units and formations established in 1955
Mountain West Conference marching bands